The Bon Secours Mother and Baby Home (also known as St Mary's Mother and Baby Home or simply The Home) that operated between 1925 and 1961 in the town of Tuam, County Galway, Ireland, was a maternity home for unmarried mothers and their children. The Home was run by the Bon Secours Sisters, a religious order of Catholic nuns, that also operated the Grove Hospital in the town. Unmarried pregnant women were sent to the Home to give birth.

In 2012, the Health Service Executive raised concerns that up to 1,000 children had been sent from the Home, for the purpose of illegal adoptions in the United States, without their mothers' consent. However, subsequent research discovered files relating to just 36 illegal foreign adoptions from the home.

Separately in 2012, a local historian, Catherine Corless, published an article documenting the history of the home before she uncovered the names of the children who died in the home the following year. In 2014, Anna Corrigan uncovered the inspection reports of the home, which noted that the most commonly recorded causes of death among the infants were congenital debilities, infectious diseases and malnutrition (including marasmus-related malnutrition). Corless' research led her to conclude that almost all had been buried in an unmarked and unregistered site at the Home, and the article claimed that there was a high death rate of residents. Corless estimated that nearly 800 children had died at the home.

The Home was investigated by the Mother and Baby Homes Commission of Investigation, a statutory commission of investigation under Judge Yvonne Murphy. Excavations carried out between November 2016 and February 2017, that had been ordered by the Commission, found a significant quantity of human remains, aged from 35 foetal weeks to two to three years, interred in "a vault with twenty chambers".  Carbon dating confirmed that the remains date from the time the home was operated by the Bon Secours order. The Commission said that it was shocked by the discovery, and that it would continue its investigation into who was responsible for the disposal of human remains in this way.

Corless's original research noted that the site was also the location of a septic tank when overlaid with maps of the period of use as a workhouse. The 2017 report by an Expert Technical Group, commissioned by the Department of Children and Youth Affairs, confirmed that the vault was a sewage tank after reviewing historical records and conducting a magnetometer survey; it concluded, "The combination of an institutional boarding home and commingled interments of juvenile remains in a sewage treatment system is a unique situation, with no directly comparable domestic or international cases."

In October 2018, the Irish government announced that it would introduce legislation to facilitate a full excavation of the mass grave and site, and for forensic DNA testing to be carried out on the remains, at a cost estimated to be between €6 and €13 million. The Mother and Baby Home Commission finalised its report in 2020, and it was published in January 2021. The Bon Secours Sisters issued an apology in the wake of the report's publication, stating "We did not live up to our Christianity when running the Home."

History

Between 1925 and 1961 in Tuam, a town in County Galway, the Bon Secours Sisters ran "The Home", an institution where thousands of unmarried pregnant women gave birth. Previously, it had been a workhouse and military barracks.

Workhouse and military barracks
The building that eventually became "The Home" was built in 1841 as a workhouse under the Irish Poor Laws. Like many other workhouses, it had been designed by Poor Law Commissioners' architect George Wilkinson to house about 800 people. This workhouse opened in 1846, close to the peak of the Great Famine. As well as dormitories, the main building contained an infirmary and an "idiots' ward". Sheds were constructed on the property to house additional inmates and fever victims. A fever hospital was later constructed next door. After the Famine, the workhouse continued to house the poor and homeless for more than sixty years.

In 1916, during the uprising against British rule, British troops took over the workhouse, evicted the occupants and made the building their barracks. In 1923, during the Irish Civil War, six anti-treaty IRA volunteers were imprisoned and executed at the workhouse by Irish Free State forces, followed by two others some weeks later. These were among the last executions of the Civil War. The nuns who took over the building later erected a crucifix in memory of the executed IRA members.

Mother and Baby Home
The order of Bon Secours Sisters, led by Mother Hortense McNamara, took over the Tuam Workhouse in 1925 and converted it into "The Home". This resulted from the prior closure of all workhouses in the county by the Galway Board of Health, and the transfer of the hospital wing of Glenamaddy Workhouse to Tuam.

Unmarried single women who became pregnant were sent to give birth there, rather than at a hospital or at home. The nuns may have included trained nurses, but were extremely unlikely to have been midwives, as the Papal prohibition on nuns being midwives or attending births wasn't lifted until 1936. In 1927, the Board of Health directed that a maternity ward be added to the Home so that the mothers could be segregated from the public wards. This was built in 1929. The mothers were required to stay inside the Home for one year, doing unpaid work for the nuns, as reimbursement for some of the services rendered. They were separated from their children, who remained separately in the Home, raised by nuns, until they could be adopted – often without consent.

Some women who had had two confinements were sent directly to nearby Magdalene laundries after giving birth, as punishment for their perceived "recidivism". According to Professor Maria Luddy, "Such a stance, though not intended to be penal, allowed for the development of an attitude that accepted detention as a means of protecting society from these reoffending women."

For each mother and child in the home, the County Council paid the nuns £1 a week. (Average female earnings in 1949 were £2.97/week; a loaf of bread cost three pence; a stone of potatoes (6.35 kg) cost 14 pence)).

At the end of the year, the mothers left while their babies were typically kept at the Home. The children stayed there until they could be adopted, fostered, or until they were old enough to be sent to industrial boarding schools. Even at the time, there were some complaints of fostered children being exploited. An October 1953 article in The Tuam Herald said "an effort was not always made to find the home that most suited the child or the child that most suited the home. The allowance given to foster parents was not always spent on the child's welfare". Local historian Catherine Corless also uncovered one case where a mother found work in England and paid the nuns to care for her son in the Home. The nuns did not tell her that her son had been fostered and kept each installment that she sent them. Some babies were sent to clergy in the United States to be illegally adopted by Catholic families there.

A 1947 report by an official inspector who visited the Home says some of the children were suffering from malnutrition, and 12 out of 31 infants examined were described as being "emaciated and not thriving". It also says that the Home was overcrowded, with 271 children and 61 mothers living there. Death rates were extraordinarily high: 34 per cent of children died in the home in 1943; 25 per cent died in 1944; 23 per cent died in 1945; 27 per cent died in 1946.  The report states "The death rate amongst infants is high... The death rate had appeared to be on the decrease but has now begun to rise again. It is time to enquire into the possible cause before the death rate mounts higher."  The report went on to say, "the care given to infants in the Home is good, the Sisters are careful and attentive; diets are excellent. It is not here that we must look for cause of the death rate".

An inspection two years later in 1949, conducted by inspectors from the Galway County Council, reported "everything in the home in good order and congratulated the Bon Secour sisters on the excellent condition of their Institution".

The Home closed in 1961, and most of the occupants were sent to similar institutions, such as Sean Ross Abbey in Roscrea. The building lay mostly disused until its demolition in 1972, and a new housing estate was built on the site.

Mass grave

1975 find
In 1975, two boys, ages 10 and 12, were playing at the site of the former Mother and Baby Home. They found a hole or chamber "filled to the brim" with children's skeletons underneath a concrete slab. One of them later said he had seen about twenty skeletons. The slab was believed by some to have covered the former Home's septic tank. Locals speculated that these were the remains of victims of the Great Famine, unbaptised babies, and/or stillborn babies from the Home. The number of bodies was then unknown, but was assumed to be small. It was re-sealed shortly afterwards, following prayers at the site by a priest. For the next 35 years the burial site was tended to by a local couple, who also built a small grotto there.

2012 article
In 2012, local historian Catherine Corless published an article about the home in the annual Journal of the Old Tuam Society.  At that stage she did not have the names of all of the children who had died there. In 2013, Ann Glennon, a public servant at the Galway Health Service Executive registrar for births, deaths and marriages, at Corless' request and expense, retrieved the names of the 796 children who had death certificates listing "The Tuam Home" or the "Tuam Children's Home" as place of death. Most of the children were infants and had died at the Home during its years of operation (1925–1961). In 2018, Glennon said she was "privileged" to be able to carry out the work.

Corless studied the state death certificates and found that they listed a range of ailments such as tuberculosis, convulsions, measles, whooping cough, malnutrition and influenza. She then cross-referenced the names with those in local graveyards and found that only two had been buried in any of them. Her research led her to conclude that the only possible location for the bodies was the site where the skeletons were found in 1975. Maps showed that this was the site of the Home's septic tank. Corless believed that some of the skeletons found are inside the septic tank. This common burial ground was unmarked and not registered with the authorities; no records were kept of any burials there. International media outlets and other commentators described the site as a "mass grave".

Corless's conclusions were supported by some local residents who recalled seeing nuns and workmen apparently burying remains there late in the evenings. In 2010, the bodies of 222 infants from Bethany Home, another maternity home, were found in a mass unmarked grave in Dublin.

2014 media coverage
In April 2014, Corless's research into Tuam was publicised during the dedication of a memorial to the 222 dead children at the Bethany Home. Corless is campaigning for a similar grave marker to be placed at the Tuam site.

Numerous news reports alleging the existence of a mass grave containing 800 babies in a septic tank, based on Corless' work, were published - first by journalist Alison O'Reilly, in the Irish Mail on Sunday, and later by international media outlets in late May/early June 2014. The story sparked outrage in Ireland and internationally.

The Irish government came under pressure to launch an investigation. The government called the allegations "deeply disturbing" and ordered the police to begin a preliminary investigation, with the aim of launching an inquiry.

Reaction to the reports
After the issue received global attention in 2014, some commentators, in advance of official factfinding investigations, criticised the story and proffered alternative explanations for the presence of bodies in a septic tank.  Some of their suggested explanations were not supported or were actively disproved by the subsequent 2017 Mother and Baby Homes Commission of Investigation interim report, following excavations of the site.

Local Gardaí initially surmised that any bones on the site likely dated from the Great Famine in the 19th-century: "These are historical burials going back to famine times. There is no suggestion of any impropriety". Bones of famine victims had been found nearby in 2012, and archaeologists determined that they were 19th century "paupers" from the same Tuam Poor Law Union Workhouse which had originally occupied the building later used for the Bon Secours Children's Home. The Gardaí were later ordered to investigate and issue a report on their findings by the Minister for Justice.

Data from the National Archives from 1947 showed that during the preceding twelve months, the death rate of children in Bon Secours was almost twice that of some other mother and baby homes. A government inter-departmental report into the records stated that an "assessment of mortality rates will need public health specialist/historical analysis of statistics on children born and resident at the home in Tuam".

Professor Liam Delaney said the high child death rate at the Home could not be explained by higher overall child death rates at the time, nor by the higher death rate among "illegitimate" children. He added: "This points to something serious within these institutions".

Kevin Higgins, a solicitor representing former residents, said that the number of deaths recorded at the Tuam home over a period of over more than 30 years was "off the scale" compared to the rate of children's deaths elsewhere at the same time.

Additional coverage
An RTÉ documentary in the Would You Believe series, on the topic of the Tuam Babies, was broadcast on Sunday, 12 April 2015.

In October 2017, The New York Times published an extended multimedia article, The Lost Children of Tuam, by Dan Barry and others covering the home, the children and the burial site. 

In November 2022, TheJournal.ie published a podcast series titled Redacted Lives. Episode 3,  Tuam, focuses on the Bon Secours Mother and Baby Home.

HSE child trafficking allegation
On 3 June 2015, the Irish Examiner published a special report which claimed that the Health Services Executive (HSE) had voiced concerns in 2012 that up to a thousand children may have been trafficked from the home, and recommending that the then health minister, James Reilly, be informed so that "a fully fledged, fully resourced forensic investigation and state inquiry" could be launched.

The issue had arisen within the HSE when a principal social worker responsible for adoption discovered "a large archive of photographs, documentation and correspondence relating to children sent for adoption to the USA" and "documentation in relation to discharges and admissions to psychiatric institutions in the Western area".

The HSE noted that letters from the Home to parents asked for money for the upkeep of their children and notes that the duration of stay for children may have been prolonged by the order for financial reasons.  It also uncovered letters to parents asking for money for the upkeep of some children that had already been discharged or had died. The social worker had compiled a list of "up to 1,000 names".  HSE reports mentioned the possibility that up to 1,000 children had been trafficked for adoption. One of those reports mentioned that it was possible that death certificates were falsified so children could be "brokered for adoption", which could "prove to be a scandal that dwarfs other, more recent issues with the Church and State". The report noted that deaths recorded at the Bessborough mother and baby home in Cork dropped "dramatically" in 1950 with the introduction of adoption legislation, stating "This...may point to babies being identified for adoption, principally to the USA, but have been recorded as infant deaths in Ireland and notified to the parents accordingly." The Bon Secours Sisters in a statement said "As the Commission of Investigation has now been established the Sisters of Bon Secours do not believe it would be appropriate to comment further except to say that they will co-operate fully with that commission."

The October 2012 HSE memo recommended that due to the gravity of the issue, the then Health Minister be informed with a view towards launching a full inquiry.  That did not happen, with the Minister only becoming involved following the revelations in the press of a mass grave at the home in May 2014.

The report states that if thousands of babies were illegally adopted to the United States, without the willing consent of the birth mother, then this practice was facilitated by doctors, social workers, religious orders, and many more people in positions of authority. The report states that there is a real danger that some of these people may still work within the system.

Writing in a 2012 HSE report, Declan McKeown, a consultant public health physician and medical epidemiologist stated that the infant mortality rate in the home were "similar to those recorded at Bessborough" (another Mother and Baby Home), which were five times the rate for Ireland in 1950 and 65 times the 2012 rate. McKeown stated that these rates were equivalent to the infant mortality rate in Ireland in the 1700s.

The commission's report subsequently found that the 2012 HSE report was based on conjecture accepted as fact, and that overseas adoptions had been overestimated in the case of Tuam. The 'large archive of photographs, documentation and letters' was revealed to be just two passport photographs and the original source witness had found no evidence of trafficking of babies. However, the Commission concluded that allegations of foreign adoptions for money were "impossible to prove and impossible to disprove."

Commission of Investigation

Following the revelations about the mass grave, there were calls locally and internationally for an investigation of the Tuam site and an inquiry into all such mother and baby homes. The Gardaí had initially released a statement saying "These are historical burials going back to famine times. There is no suggestion of any impropriety and there is no garda investigation. Also, there is no confirmation from any source that there are between 750 and 800 bodies present." On 4 June 2014 the Irish government announced it was putting together representatives from various government departments to investigate the deaths at the home and propose how to address the issue. The then Minister for Children and Youth Affairs Charles Flanagan said any government inquiry would not be confined to the home in Tuam and that officials would advise the Government on the best form of inquiry before the end of June 2014.

On 6 June, two senior Gardaí were appointed to lead a "fact-finding" mission. They were asked to gather all surviving records and to carry out preliminary tests on the suspected mass grave. Gardaí said there was no criminal investigation as yet because there was no evidence of a crime, but senior sources said the review may change that.

On 16 July 2014, the Irish Government appointed Judge Yvonne Murphy to chair the Commission of Investigation into Mother and Baby homes. In October 2014, the Minister for Children and Youth Affairs, James Reilly, announced that the draft terms of reference for the inquiry had been circulated to government departments for comment.

In September 2014, a legal representative of former residents of the home has called on the Attorney General to order coroner's inquests to be carried out into the deaths. This would necessitate excavations and exhumations of the site, which is authorised under the 1962 Coroner's Act.

On 19 February 2015, the then Minister for Children, James Reilly, announced that the terms of reference had been set out for the "establishment of the independent commission, which has a three-year deadline and which will cost approximately €21 million, followed the signing by the Taoiseach of a Government order at Tuesday's Cabinet meeting". The three-person Commission comprises Judge Yvonne Murphy as chairperson, with international legal expert on child protection and adoption Dr William Duncan, and historian Professor Mary E. Daly, appointed as Commissioners.

On 25 May 2015, a remembrance ceremony for those who died at the Home was organised by a coalition of survivors' groups and was held outside Government Buildings.  The organisers also sought: 
 "A separate and immediate acknowledgment, apology and redress to an aging survivor community"
 "Full Inclusion. All single mothers and their children who were forcibly separated are to be included in the Commission of Inquiry as well as any home or institution related to these activities including all illegal activities."
 "Senator Averil Power's Adoption Bill to be passed within six months to open all lifelong sealed adoption files"

2017 find
On 3 March 2017, the Mother and Baby Homes Commission of Investigation announced that human remains had been found during a test excavation carried out at the site between November 2016 and February 2017. Tests conducted on some of the remains indicated they had been aged between 35 foetal weeks and 2–3 years.  The announcement confirmed that the deceased died during the period of time that the property was used by the Mother and Baby Home, not from an earlier period, as most of the bodies dated from the 1920s to the 1950s. The remains were found in an "underground structure divided into 20 chambers". While some speculated that this indicated that "children who died at the home were interred on the site in unmarked graves, a common practice at such Catholic-run facilities amid high child mortality rates in early 20th-century Ireland," the Commission said "it had not yet determined what the purpose of this structure was but it appeared to be a sewage tank. The commission had also not yet determined if it was ever used for this purpose."

The Commission stated that it was continuing its investigation into who was responsible for the disposal of human remains in this way, that it had also asked the relevant State authorities to take responsibility for the appropriate treatment of the remains, and that it had notified the coroner. Minister for Children, Katherine Zappone said that the coroner's results would determine the direction of the investigation and that the commission would determine if other sites needed to be excavated, including another part of the Tuam site.

The Adoption Rights Alliance and Justice for Magdalenes Research campaign groups demanded that Zappone publish a five-month-old report from the commission on the issue of broadening the probe's terms of reference beyond the original 18 institutions included, and said the State must ensure that all human remains buried in unmarked graves at institutions in Ireland are identified.

Reactions

Political reactions 
Then Taoiseach, Enda Kenny, described the findings as "truly appalling", saying "the babies of single mothers involved had been treated like some kind of sub-species." He commended the work of Catherine Corless in bringing the issue to light. Speaking on the find in Dáil Éireann, in response to requests to widen the terms of reference of the Commission, he described the Mother and Baby Home as "a chamber of horrors".

In the same debate, AAA-PBP T.D. Bríd Smith called for the Bon Secours order of nuns to be disbanded. She said "its hospital empire, the biggest private hospital group in the State, was built on the bones of the dead Tuam babies."  Smith said "everyone was not responsible for what happened in Tuam. It was paid for by the State, which knew exactly what was going on, and there were 'headage payments' of up to $3,000 for each child sent to the United States."

The Taoiseach's speech was criticised by some. In the Dáil, independent member Catherine Connolly directly addressed the speech, stating: 

Leader of Fianna Fáil, Micheál Martin T.D., called for a state apology for the infants, a commemoration to be held for them, and for the expansion of the Commission of Inquiry to include other institutions and sites.

The then Minister for Justice, Frances Fitzgerald, stated that "the discovery is an infinitely sad reminder of an Ireland that was a very harsh, harsh place for women and their babies" and that "it shows the tortured relationship the State and church had with pregnant women - it is a tragedy that we are now facing in its entirety."

The President of Ireland, Michael D. Higgins, speaking about the find at an International Women's Day reception, said there "are dark shadows that hang over our meeting, shadows that require us all to summon up yet again a light that might dispel the darkness to which so many women and their children were condemned, and the questions left unanswered as we moved on." President Higgins described Catherine Corless' work as "another necessary step in blowing open the locked doors of a hidden Ireland".

Reaction by the Catholic Church 
The Catholic Archbishop of Tuam, Michael Neary, said that he is horrified by the confirmation that significant quantities of human remains were buried on the site of a former mother and baby home in the town. Describing the news as "a body blow", he said he had been "greatly shocked to learn of the scale of the practice during the time in which the Bon Secours ran the mother and baby home in Tuam".

The Irish Catholic Bishops' Conference apologized for the hurt caused by its part in the system, which they said also involved adoptions. They also urged parishes to ensure that the burial sites of former residents are appropriately marked, and said that "the appalling story of life, death and adoptions related to the Mother and Baby Homes has shocked everyone in Ireland and beyond."

Reactions of Catherine Corless and Irish media 
Both TV3 and RTÉ broadcast documentaries on the scandal, with the latter's Claire Byrne Live including a segment listing the names of all 796 children who had died at the home.

Corless appeared on The Late Late Show on 10 March 2017, alongside Tuam survivor Peter Mulryan, whose sister is buried in the Tuam grave, Anna Corrigan, whose two brothers were born in Tuam, and journalist Alison O'Reilly, who broke the story. Corless received a standing ovation at the end of the segment. Host Ryan Tubridy said "If that audience represents the people watching tonight, there is a hunger in this country for the truth."

Corless was awarded the Bar Council of Ireland's Human Rights Award in October 2017, an award presented for "exceptional humanitarian service".  In her acceptance speech, she said: 

Paul McGarry, SC, chairman of Bar Council, in presenting the award, said of Corless "She has worked tirelessly on their behalf and has shone a light on a dark period of our history, passionately represented the victims and their rights at all times, often in the face of adversity.  She epitomises the very essence of a humanitarian and is a very deserving recipient of this award."

In October 2018, Corless was awarded an honorary doctorate by NUI Galway. Making the award, Professor Caroline McGregor of NUIG's School of Political Science and Sociology said Corless' research "sought to re-subjectify the children who had died and their families and relatives because in the moment of their death, they were treated more like objects to dispose of rather than subjects with right for dignity, justice and respect in life and in death. Her work is not just about a focus on those who died but also those who continue to live with the pain, trauma and hurt in the present." She received an honorary degree from Trinity College Dublin in December 2018.

Investigation team
In June 2017, Minister Zappone announced the appointment of an "Expert Technical Group" team of international experts, comprising an Irish-based forensic archaeologist, a US-based forensic anthropologist and a UK-based forensic scientist, to investigate the burial site.  Zappone also said that she was considering broadening the terms of reference for the Commission, in order to "help to answer some of the questions which have been raised again in public debate".  The team is led by Dr. Niamh McCullagh, who previously worked with the Independent Commission for the Location of Victims' Remains in Northern Ireland and the Joint Prisoner of War/Missing in Action Command that aimed to locate the bodies of war dead.

Zappone stated that McCullagh will identify options for government, looking at the possibility of exhuming the remains and identifying if there are any further remains on the site that have yet to be discovered.

The team conducted an extensive geophysical survey on the site in July 2017. This consisted of data collection through a variety of non-invasive techniques, over the course of five days.  The team liaised with the Coroner for North Galway, the Garda Síochána, the National Monuments Services and Forensic Science Ireland, and advice was received from the International Committee for the Red Cross.

Expert Technical Group report
In December 2017, the Expert Technical Group reported to the Department of Children and Youth Affairs, outlining five possible courses of action on the Tuam site. The five possible courses of action outlined are:
 Memorialisation: No further investigative work; Return the site to being managed as a memorial; Make site safe for public access.
 Exhume known human remains: Recover human remains interred in the chambered structure identified to date and reinter elsewhere; No further forensic analysis of remains.
 Forensic excavation and recovery of known human remains: Complete forensic archaeological excavation, recovery and analysis of human remains from the chambers identified to date.
 Forensic excavation and recovery, and further evaluation/ excavation of other areas of potential burial/ interest: Complete forensic excavation and recovery of all human remains in memorial garden and any other targeted area, following geophysical survey, assessment of witness statements, historical records, etc.
 Forensic excavation of total available area: Full forensic and archaeological excavation of all available ground formerly occupied by the M&B Home. Excludes private built areas (houses and gardens etc. subsequently built on the former site).

Zappone said that before any decision was taken on the option to be used, she first wanted to consult with the local community in Tuam and other affected parties, such as relatives of those who were resident in the home. She said the consultation process, which would be undertaken by Galway County Council, would take three months.

The Tuam Home Survivors Network said its members had given careful consideration to the Expert Technical Group's report and that the only appropriate action was "a complete excavation of the Tuam site to ensure the recovery of all human remains contained there". The Network are also seeking postmortems in respect of each set of human remains and cataloguing of DNA from all remains in order to create the most complete database possible.

The Technical Group also identified a number of human rights issues which were outside its terms of reference. Zappone appointed human rights expert and Special Rapporteur on Child Protection, Professor Geoffrey Shannon, to examine these issues and to report to her on his findings. Shannon's report was published on 23 October 2018, the same day as the announcement that the Tuam site would be fully excavated.

Excavation decision
On 23 October 2018, Minister Zappone announced that the Government had approved her recommendation for full forensic excavation of the available site. The approach taken will involve what is known as "Humanitarian Forensic Action" and will include:

 a phased approach to the forensic excavation and recovery of the human remains;
 the use of systematic on-site ground-truthing and test excavations to effectively locate potential burials;
 the forensic analysis of any recovered remains and, where possible, individualisation and identification, and
 arrangements for respectful reburial and memorialisation and the appropriate conservation of the site.

Zappone said "I am committed to ensuring that all the children interred at this site can have a dignified and respectful burial", and that "this comprehensive and scientific approach provides us with the best opportunity to address the many deeply personal questions to which former residents and their families need answers." Zappone said that due to the "unprecedented" nature of the site, bespoke legislation would be required in advance of the commencement of further excavations and forensic and DNA testing, and that drafting of such legislation is expected to commence in November 2018.

Catherine Corless said that the full excavation and DNA testing announced was everything that they had been campaigning for. The Tuam Babies Family Group welcomed the announcement, saying "This is an exceptionally important decision and will pave the way for all the other mother and baby homes, and the lost children of Ireland. We hope this decision will bring peace to the families of these children."

The Bon Secours Sisters have offered a €2.5 million voluntary contribution towards the costs of excavation and forensic excavation, which are estimated at between €6 and €13 million. Zappone stated that this contribution was not a settlement or an indemnity.

In December 2018, the Taoiseach announced that legislation would be required to enable the full excavation to proceed. The required legislation is expected to be passed in the first half of 2019, with procurement of specialist services and planning going ahead at the same time, with the excavations then proceeding in the latter half of 2019. Taoiseach Varadkar said "We've never really done this before in Ireland, on this scale, so we've a lot to set up, a lot to learn before we do it. We're not entirely sure what we're getting into, but as a Government we're convinced this is the right thing to do, to remove the remains and to give those children a proper decent burial they didn't get."

Final report
The final report of the Commission was submitted to the Minister for Children, Equality, Disability, Integration & Youth on 30 October 2020, and was published on 12 January 2021.  The report detailed an "appalling level of infant mortality at mother-and-baby homes," and said "in the years before 1960 mother-and-baby homes did not save the lives of 'illegitimate' children; in fact, they appear to have significantly reduced their prospects of survival", stating that 9,000 children had died in the 18 institutions covered by the Commission's terms of reference, between 1922 and 1998 - an infant mortality rate almost double that of the general population - and one in seven died. It was also announced that the Taoiseach, Micheál Martin, would apologise to survivors on behalf of the state.

Pope's visit to Ireland, August 2018

Katherine Zappone raised the issue of the mass grave with Pope Francis when she met him on his visit to Áras an Uachtaráin on Saturday 25 August, and presented him with a memorandum on the issue, telling him "I hope the church will make reparations for this shameful chapter. It is important and I will write to you in detail." Speaking to members of the press, Pope Francis said "She told me, and she was brief: 'Holy Father, we found mass graves of children, buried children, we're investigating... and the Church has something to do with this.' But she said it very politely and truly with a lot of respect. I thanked her to the point that this had touched my heart."

A march from Tuam town hall to the Bon Secours site and a subsequent vigil were attended by over 1,000 people Sunday 26 August 2018, timed to coincide with a mass being celebrated by Pope Francis in the Phoenix Park, Dublin, during his visit to Ireland.  The names of the dead were read out and a sculpture in memory of the dead was unveiled.

Catherine Corless had been invited to attend a state reception for the pope by the office of the Taoiseach, Leo Varadkar, but she declined the invitation, saying "I had to take a stand with the babies. We have asked the Church to meet with survivors and to talk to us about the babies in the sewage tank. We have asked the Bon Secours sisters to give us some record, to come to Tuam, to help the survivors; to talk to them. For the last four years none of the priests or the Archbishop of Tuam indeed would entertain us." In advance of the papal visit to Ireland, Corless wrote to the Vatican to ask that the pope meet one of the survivors of the home. She stated that her request had not been answered.

In December 2018, the Sunday Independent published excerpts from a letter from Pope Francis replying to Katherine Zappone's letter, which it interpreted as putting pressure on religious orders to accept responsibility for the treatment of children who died in mother and baby homes. The Pope wrote "I pray in particular that efforts made by the Government and by local churches and religious congregations will help face, responsibly, this tragic chapter in Ireland's history." No mention was made of additional reparations, as sought by the Minister. The Taoiseach described the response as "more of an acknowledgement than a substantive response."

Irish Council for Civil Liberties call, August 2018
On the 2018 International Day of the Disappeared (30 August), Liam Herrick, Director of the Irish Council for Civil Liberties, called for an investigation into the Bon Secours home and related issues such as the Magdalene Laundries and forced and illegal adoptions, saying Ireland had several questions to answer on enforced disappearances and what happened to unmarried mothers and their children throughout the 20th century. He said that: "When we look at Tuam, we're talking here about the obligations of the State to take all measures possible to identify the children who died in Tuam. And then to, where possible, return the remains to the families. We also are talking about a full public investigation into the circumstances of what happened at Tuam and steps being taken to guarantee that nothing of this nature could ever happen in another Irish institution in the future."

Apology by Bon Secours Sisters
Following the release of the final report of the Mother and Baby Homes Commission of Investigation, the Bon Secours Sisters released an apology. It states:

The order also committed to participating in a "Restorative Recognition Scheme" to be set up to compensate survivors.

Institutional Burials Bill
It was announced in February 2022 that the cabinet had agreed an 'Institutional Burials Bill', intended to provides a lawful basis for the forensic excavation, recovery and DNA analysis of remains from the site of the former institution and other sites. It will allow families to be reunited with the remains of their loved ones, and according to Minister for Children Roderic O'Gorman, it "will ensure that the children there have the dignified burial that has been denied to them for so long".

Grove Hospital
Some Tuam residents have now called for an investigation into the town's Grove Hospital, which had also been run by the Bon Secours order. A number of people have claimed their children or siblings were buried on the site from the 1950s right up until the late 1970s, although the order denies that there was a graveyard on the site. Galway County Council has stipulated that an archaeologist must monitor excavation work on the site in order to preserve any remains which may be buried there.

See also

 Bethany Mother and Child Home
 Cavan Orphanage Fire
 St Patrick's Mother and Baby Home
 Magdalene Laundries in Ireland
2021 Canadian Indian residential schools gravesite discoveries

References

Further reading

External links
 Shining a light on Tuam and the ubiquitous adoption machine
 Mother and Baby Home website
 Scanned version of the original article by Catherine Corless on the Bon Secours Mother and Baby Home, first published in the Journal of the Old Tuam Society
 Radio Foyle Interview with Catherine Corless, 27 May 2014
 BBC Our World 2014 documentary Ireland's Hidden Bodies Hidden Secrets, by Sue Lloyd-Roberts
 List of 796 children who died at the home (text)
 
 Technical Report on the Tuam Site Stage 2: Options and Appropriate Courses of Action available to Government at the site of the former Mother and Baby Home, Tuam, Co. Galway
 Final Report of the Mother and Baby Homes Commission of Investigation

2014 in the Republic of Ireland
2017 in the Republic of Ireland
2018 in the Republic of Ireland
2021 in the Republic of Ireland
Bon Secours Sisters
Buildings and structures in Tuam
Burials in the Republic of Ireland
Child abuse in the Republic of Ireland
History of Catholicism in Ireland
Mass graves
Religion in Tuam
Scandals in the Republic of Ireland
Poor law infirmaries
Mother and baby homes in Ireland
1925 establishments in Ireland
1961 disestablishments in Ireland